Aidan Thomas Sarikaya (born 3 July 1996) is a New Zealand field hockey player who plays as a defender or midfielder for Belgian club Herakles and the New Zealand national team.

Club career
Sarikaya played for the Midlands team in the New Zealand National Hockey League. In 2019 he moved to Europe to play for Herkales in Belgium for the 2019–20 season.

International career

Junior national team
Sarikaya made his debut for the national under 18 team in 2014, at a qualifying event for the 2014 Summer Youth Olympics. Sarikaya again represented the national U18 side at the Youth Olympics, held in Nanjing, China. In 2016, Sarikaya made his debut for the national under 21 team at the Junior Oceania Cup. New Zealand successfully qualified for the Junior World Cup in Lucknow, India, where Sarikaya was also a member of the U21 side.

Senior national team
Sarikaya made his senior international debut in 2017, at the International Festival of Hockey in Victoria, Australia. In 2018, Sarikaya most notably represented New Zealand at the Commonwealth Games, where New Zealand won a silver medal.

References

External links
 

1996 births
Living people
New Zealand male field hockey players
Male field hockey defenders
Male field hockey midfielders
Field hockey players at the 2014 Summer Youth Olympics
Field hockey players at the 2018 Commonwealth Games
Field hockey players at the 2022 Commonwealth Games
2018 Men's Hockey World Cup players
Commonwealth Games medallists in field hockey
Commonwealth Games silver medallists for New Zealand
Men's Belgian Hockey League players
Expatriate field hockey players
New Zealand expatriate sportspeople in Belgium
New Zealand expatriate sportspeople in Germany
Place of birth missing (living people)
2023 Men's FIH Hockey World Cup players
20th-century New Zealand people
21st-century New Zealand people
Medallists at the 2018 Commonwealth Games